Daniel Barbara (born 12 October 1974 in France) was a French footballer who played as a forward for Darlington in The Football League.

External links

1974 births
Living people
French footballers
Association football forwards
Darlington F.C. players
Tours FC players
English Football League players
Association football midfielders